The general election of Missouri State Auditor occurred during the 2022 United States midterm election, along with the 2022 United States Senate election in Missouri, on November 8, 2022. Incumbent State Auditor Nicole Galloway, Missouri's only statewide elected Democrat did not seek re-election to a second full term in office. Missouri State Treasurer Scott Fitzpatrick won the election, leaving Democrats with no statewide seats in Missouri.

Democratic primary

Candidates

Declared 
Alan Green, former state representative (2014–2021)

Withdrew
Nicole Galloway, incumbent State Auditor (2015–2023)

Results

Republican primary

Candidates

Declared
 Scott Fitzpatrick, incumbent State Treasurer (2019–2023)
Eliminated in primary
David Gregory, state representative (2017–present)

Endorsements

Polling
Graphical summary

Results

Libertarian primary

Candidates

Declared 
 John A. Hartwig Jr, accountant

Results

General election

Debates

Polling

Results

Notes

Partisan clients

References

External links 
 Official campaign websites
 Scott Fitzpatrick (R) for Auditor
 Dr. Alan Green (D) for Auditor
 John Hartwig Jr. (L) for Auditor

2022 Missouri elections
Missouri State Auditor elections
Missouri